Kinesense is computer vision and video analytics company based in Dublin, Ireland. The company is one of largest suppliers of computer vision products to the UK police, who use the technology to search CCTV content in the course of criminal investigations.

History

Kinesense was founded in Dublin in 2009 and received early investment from the Irish government's venture capital fund Enterprise Ireland.

Technology

Kinesense technology is a combination of motion detection and deep learning algorithms that have been adapted for CCTV analysis. The company also develops blockchain technology for chain of evidence The company has also worked with the London Zoo to monitor animal exhibits.

Awards

 2010 Innovation Award from Dublin Institute of Technology
 2010 IBM SmartCamp Finalists 
 2014 Won FP7 Research and Development Funding for P-React 
 2016 Won H2020 Research and Development Funding for dRedBox with IBM 
 2019 Won DTIF Research and Development Funding for the VISP project along with Overcast and Trinity College Dublin

References

External links 
 Kinesense Company Website

Information technology companies of Ireland